Marnell is a surname. Notable people with the surname include:

Cat Marnell (born 1982), American writer and socialite
John Marnell (born 1956), Irish hurler
Lewis Marnell (1892–2013), Australian skateboarder
Mark Marnell (1926–1992), Irish hurler

See also
Farnell